Torre Espacial, or Torre Interama, is a  high observation tower in the Villa Soldati section of Buenos Aires, Argentina. 

The tower was designed and manufactured in Austria by Waagner-Biro, and built between 1980 and May 1981 for the Parque de la Ciudad amusement park. The bankruptcy of the amusement park's developer, Interama S.A., delayed delivery of the observation tower components; the tower was finally opened to the public on July 9, 1985. It features observation decks at 120, 124, and 176 meters; from the highest deck it is possible to see the Uruguay coast.

The Torre Espacial was declared a City Cultural Landmark on November 22, 2010. It was closed in 2003 but following renovation works was reopened on November 26, 2011.

References

External links

Parque de la ciudad

Photos, history, construction data (Spanish)

Towers completed in 1981
Buildings and structures in Buenos Aires
Towers in Argentina
Tourist attractions in Buenos Aires
Operating amusement attractions